Jean-Michel Ferrière (born 20 November 1959 in Dompierre-sur-Besbre, France) is a retired professional footballer. He played as a striker.

References

External links
Jean-Michel Ferriere profile at chamoisfc79.fr

1959 births
Living people
French footballers
Association football forwards
FC Gueugnon players
AS Nancy Lorraine players
Chamois Niortais F.C. players
AS Beauvais Oise players
Ligue 1 players
Ligue 2 players
AS Béziers Hérault (football) players